Schepers is a Dutch and Low German occupational surname meaning "shepherd's" in Middle Dutch. Notable people with the surname include:

 Alphonse Schepers (1907–1984), Belgian racing cyclist
 Bob Schepers (born 1992), Dutch footballer
 Eddy Schepers (born 1955), Belgian cyclist
 Jan Schepers (1897–1997), Dutch fencer
  (born 1953), German auxiliary bishop
 Nancy Scheper-Hughes (born 1944), American anthropologist
 Willem Bastiaensz Schepers (1619–1704), Dutch admiral
 Wim Schepers (1943–1998), Dutch racing cyclist

See also
Scheepers
Scheppers

References

Surnames of Dutch origin
Dutch-language surnames
Occupational surnames